Spirit Falls is a  waterfall located in the Jacobs Hill open space preserve in Royalston, Massachusetts. The preserve is managed by non-profit organization The Trustees of Reservations. The  Tully Trail passes by the falls.

References 
 Jacob's Hill preserve The Trustees of Reservations. Retrieved December 19, 2008.

External links 
 Map of the Tully Trail.
 The Trustees of Reservations

Landforms of Worcester County, Massachusetts
Waterfalls of Massachusetts
Protected areas of Worcester County, Massachusetts
The Trustees of Reservations
Open space reserves of Massachusetts
Royalston, Massachusetts